Pennsylvania State Senate District 7 includes parts of Montgomery County and Philadelphia County. It is currently represented by Democrat Vincent Hughes.

District profile
The district includes the following areas:

Montgomery County
 Conshohocken
 Whitemarsh Township

Philadelphia County
Ward 04
Ward 06
Ward 12 [PART, Divisions 08, 11, 15, 16, 17, 22, 23 and 24]
Ward 21
Ward 24
Ward 27 [PART, Divisions 03, 06, 11, 13 and 18]
Ward 28
Ward 34
Ward 38
Ward 44
Ward 46 [PART, Divisions 07, 19, 22 and 23]
Ward 52
Ward 60 [PART, Divisions 01, 02, 03, 04, 05, 08, 09, 12, 13, 14, 15, 16 and 23]

Senators

References

Pennsylvania Senate districts
Government of Philadelphia
Government of Montgomery County, Pennsylvania